St Brendan's Church is a small Gothic Revival Anglican church located in Kilmocomogue, Bantry, County Cork, Ireland. It was completed in 1828. It is dedicated to Brendan the Navigator. It is part of the Kilmocomogue Union of Parishes in the Diocese of Cork, Cloyne, and Ross.

History 
The Church of Saint Brendan the Navigator was built between 1815 and 1828. A new chancel and a chancel arch were added in 1868. A church bell was added in the 1880s. In 2000, the church was rededicated to Brendan the Navigator.

Architecture 

The church was designed by English architect Henry Edward Kendall. It is built in the Gothic Revival architectural style. A statue of Saint Brendan is erected in the square outside the church. It is built of green slate rubble stone, and features a font gifted by William Hedges-White, the 3rd Earl of Bantry.

References

Notes

Sources 

 

Architecture in Ireland
Churches in the Diocese of Cork, Cloyne and Ross
19th-century Church of Ireland church buildings
Gothic Revival church buildings in the Republic of Ireland
19th-century churches in the Republic of Ireland